DC Graphic Novels for Kids, formerly known as DC Zoom, is an imprint of American comic book publisher DC Comics consisting of original one-shots and reprints of books previously published under other imprints. The imprint intends to present traditional DC Universe characters for middle-grade readers. The first title of the DC Zoom imprint, DC Super Hero Girls: Search for Atlantis was published on September 26, 2018. Black Canary: Ignite and Super Sons Book Two: The Foxglove Mission were the last titles to be published under DC Ink. Diana: Princess of the Amazons, the first title of DC Graphic Novels for Kids, was published on January 7, 2020. The first reprint, DC Super Hero Girls: Weird Science was published on July 14, 2020.

History

Launch 

In 2017, DC Comics announced that a new untitled young readers imprint would launch in 2018. Abraham Riesman, for Vulture, highlighted a shift in audience for graphic novels that didn't have to do with either Marvel or DC Comics; Riesman wrote that "shift was the result of decisions made by librarians, teachers, kids’-book publishers, and people born after the year 2000. Abruptly, the most important sector in the world of sequential art has become graphic novels for young people. [...] According to Milton Griepp of comics-industry analysis site ICv2, aggregated annual comics sales across different kinds of retailers for 2016 revealed that more than half of the top-ten comics franchises were ones aimed at kids. [...] DC is hiring for a new division targeted at young readers, and has already done a bit of a stealth launch by publishing youth-friendly takes on their fabled characters like Supergirl: Being Super and DC Super Hero Girls: Finals Crisis".

Two graphic novels lines were revealed in 2018; the DC Zoom imprint for middle grade readers and the DC Ink for young adult readers. The New York Times reported that "though a few of the graphic novels will have creators who are already working in the comic book industry, the majority of the writers are a Who's Who of popular novelists for young readers. [...] While staple-bound comic books have traditionally appealed to an audience of male readers, graphic novels have a more diverse readership". Michele Wells, the vice president for content strategy at DC, said "if you look at readership in middle grade and Y.A. in general, you’ll see a swing on the side of female readers". DC Ink and DC Zoom were created after the New 52 branding was retired in 2015 and the launch of the DCYou program which "employed younger creators than the New 52 titles, with the titles having a more contemporary feel". These imprints were built off both the creative success of DCYou and "the financial success of the DC Super Hero Girls property, which launched in 2015 and featured a line of young reader graphic novels". Dan DiDio, DC's co-publisher from 2010-2020, explained that:A lot of that had also to do with our interest in getting the young adult marketplace. That was DC testing the waters and wondering what a young adult book would be from DC Comics. We realized that ultimately, there was a strong, creative talent pool to tell those stories, but we decided we had to change the format in regards to how it appeared. That's when the DC Ink and DC Zoom books wound up being created, where we knew, This is the right direction, we know there's a market for this, but the periodical might not be the best way to deliver it. That audience might not find the periodical, but let's create it in a book. They're much more comfortable reading in that style.An expanded list of titles was then announced at San Diego Comic-Con 2018. In 2019, DC Zoom "technically launched with the continuation of DC Super Hero Girls, but the first Zoom debut was [...] Super Sons: The Polarshield Project".

Relaunch 
DC Comics began to shutter its three imprint lines and separate graphic novel titles by a three-tiered age system in June 2019: DC Zoom would become DC Kids (ages 8–12), DC Ink would become DC (ages 13+), and Vertigo would become DC Black Label (17+). The new segmentation launched in January 2020; the names of the segments also shifted to DC Graphic Novels for Kids and DC Graphic Novels for Young Adults. Later in October, DC Comics released a new boxset of select DC Zoom titles with the DC Graphic Novels for Kids branding on the slipcase.

Releases

Reprints

Reception 
Oliver Sava, for The A.V. Club, highlighted the puzzling shift of eliminating the Ink and Zoom imprints shortly after launch and right when new titles were "realizing their potential". Sava wrote, "having those clearly defined channels makes it easier for retailers, librarians, educators, and consumers to find the books that are appropriate for different age groups. The Ink and Zoom branding is still present on new releases, so maybe the market's response will change DC's plans to phase out the imprints as it gears up for its huge slate of upcoming graphic novels for young readers. And the market is responding very well. The Ink and Zoom books are in the top 10 of Diamond's graphic novel sales charts for each month they debut, and given the popularity of Harley Quinn and Superman, that trend is likely to continue with August's debuts".

Heidi MacDonald, for The Beat, wrote: "DC Comics is re-branding all its publishing under the DC brand [...]. The announcement confirms recent rumors that Vertigo, the much admired and industry changing mature-themed imprint, is being sunsetted. It's a kinder word than cancelled or killed, but still one that brings a tear to the eye. More surprisingly, however, DC Zoom (for middle grades) and DC Ink (a YA line)– two much heralded imprints for young readers– are also being phased out. The lines only launched this year and had already seen sales success. Despite this, I'm told that DC is still going full speed ahead with more material for younger readers [...]. The move to phase out the imprints is intended to make the overall DC brand more inclusive of a wide variety of material".

S.W. Sondheimer, for Book Riot, highlighted the imprint name change and stated: "A little less catchy, perhaps, but a better guide to the type of content you can expect to find in a given book [...]. Every one of the DC Graphic Novels for Young Readers and DC Graphic Novels for Young Adults has something different to offer their readers, but they're all built around forging connections, lending support to their audiences in their quests for self-realization and actualization, and most excellent hero stories. With tons more in the works, I hope these imprints, whatever their names happen to be, are around for a long time". Sondheimer also highlighted the specific themes the two imprint lines address and wrote: "Some of the protagonists are in-canon teenagers and some have been de-aged for their books, but they're all, for the purposes of this imprint, the same age as their readers, which allows those readers to forge connections with the protagonists and their stories more easily, and also helps kids self-insert to learn problem-solving skills. [...] All of the characters are heroes, yes, but they're all waging battles much more intimate and personal than defeating the Joker or the Witch Queen. They're fighting to understand themselves. [...] The other aspect of the DC Young/Young Adult Readers line I love is that, on a very basic level, each graphic novel is a family story. Almost every kind of family one can imagine has, or will, be represented".

References

External links
Press release by DC Entertainment: "SDCC: DC Announces New DC Ink & DC Zoom Graphic Novels"

DC Comics imprints
2019 in comics
2020 in comics
2021 in comics